Lars Bygdén (born 1973) is a Swedish singer, song-writer and guitarist.

Biography 

Lars Bygdén was born 1973 in Sundsvall, Sweden. His musical career started as a guitarist in the psychedelic bands Magic Broom and The Shades of Orange. In 1996 Bygdén formed the country-rock combo The Thousand Dollar Playboys. The group released two critically acclaimed albums and got a lot of attention in Swedish media. The band dissolved in 2003. Lars Bygdén has continued as a solo artist on the record label Massproduktion and released his first solo album Trading Happiness for Songs in 2005 which won the Swedish Manifest award for best singer-songwriter album of the year. The album included the song This Road, a duet featuring Ane Brun (also featured on Brun's album Duets). In 2006 Lars did the theme song for the Swedish TV-show Grattis Världen!, a cover of Iggy Pop's The Passenger. In the spring of 2009 Bygdén released his second solo-album, the conceptual Family Feelings. In 2011 he summoned 15 years of songwriting on the double album Songs I Wrote and in 2012 came the critically acclaimed LB from which the animated video to The Hole was both Grammy- and Manifest-nominated.

Discography

Albums with The Thousand Dollar Playboys 
 1999 The $1000 Playboys
 2001 Stay

Solo albums 

 2005 Trading Happiness for Songs
 2009 Family Feelings
 2012 LB
 2018 Dark Companion

Singles and EP's 

 2005 This Road EP
 2005 Dream On
 2006 The Passenger EP
 2012 I Believe in You
 2013 Maria
 2013 The Hole
 2018 We're Not About to Fall Apart

Compilation 

 2011 Songs I Wrote – double album

External links 
 Lars Bygdén's official homepage
 Lars Bygdén on MySpace

Notes

 www.larsbygden.com
 Interview Aftonbladet
 [ allmusic.com The Thousand Dollar Playboys]
 [ allmusic.com Lars Bygdén]

Swedish male singer-songwriters
Swedish singer-songwriters
Living people
1973 births
21st-century Swedish singers
21st-century Swedish male singers